Luca Borrelli (born February 21, 1989) is an Italian professional football player currently playing for Lega Pro Seconda Divisione team S.S. Scafatese Calcio 1922 on loan from S.S.C. Napoli.

See also
List of football clubs in Italy

References

External links
 

1989 births
Living people
Italian footballers
Association football forwards
A.S.G. Nocerina players